Coptosia is a genus of longhorn beetles of the subfamily Lamiinae, containing the following species:

subgenus Barbarina
 Coptosia behen (Sama & Rejzek, 1999)
 Coptosia chehirensis (Breuning, 1943)

subgenus Coptosia
 Coptosia albovittigera (Heyden, 1863)
 Coptosia antoniae (Reitter, 1889)
 Coptosia bithynensis (Ganglbauer, 1884)
 Coptosia brunnerae Sama, 2000
 Coptosia compacta (Ménétriés, 1832)
 Coptosia demelti (Breuning, 1973)
 Coptosia drurei (Pic, 1909)
 Coptosia ganglbaueri Pic, 1936
 Coptosia gianassoi Sama, 2007
 Coptosia minuta (Pic, 1892)
 Coptosia nigrosuturata Heyrovský, 1950
 Coptosia schuberti (Fuchs, 1965)
 Coptosia tauricola (Breuning, 1943)

subgenus Pseudocoptosia
 Coptosia cinerascens (Kraatz, 1882)
 Coptosia elyandti (Semenov, 1891)

References

Saperdini